The Government of India launched the Garib Kalyan Rojgar Abhiyaan (GKRA) initiative to tackle the impact of COVID-19 on shramik (migrant) workers in India. GKRA aims to give 125 days of employment to 670,000 migrant workers, approximately two-thirds of the total migrant labourer force that has gone back to rural areas. The scheme covers 116 districts in six states, Bihar, Uttar Pradesh, Madhya Pradesh, Rajasthan, Odisha and Jharkhand. The scheme is a joint effort by 12 different Ministries(Department of rural development, Department of Drinking water and sanitation, Ministry of Road Transport and Highway , Ministry of Panchayati Raj, Department of Telecommunication, Department of New and Renewable Energy, Ministry of Railways, Minisiry of Mines, Department of Agricultural Research and Education, Ministry of Environment, Forest and Climate Change, Ministry of Petroleum, Ministry of Defence) /Departments and covers 25 categories of works/ activities.

Work and activities
Works and activities include:

References 

Modi administration initiatives
2020 in Indian economy
COVID-19 pandemic in India
Economic responses to the COVID-19 pandemic